The 1998 Exide NASCAR Select Batteries 400 was the 25th stock car race of the 1998 NASCAR Winston Cup Series season and the 41st iteration of the event. The race was held on Saturday, September 12, 1998, in Richmond, Virginia, at Richmond International Raceway, a 0.75 miles (1.21 km) D-shaped oval. The race took the scheduled 400 laps to complete. In a close finish, Roush Racing driver Jeff Burton was able to fend off Hendrick Motorsports driver Jeff Gordon at the line by 0.051 seconds to win his fifth career NASCAR Winston Cup Series and his second and final victory of the season. To fill out the podium, Roush Racing driver Mark Martin would finish third.

Background 

Richmond International Raceway (RIR) is a 3/4-mile (1.2 km), D-shaped, asphalt race track located just outside Richmond, Virginia in Henrico County. It hosts the Monster Energy NASCAR Cup Series and Xfinity Series. Known as "America's premier short track", it formerly hosted a NASCAR Camping World Truck Series race, an IndyCar Series race, and two USAC sprint car races.

Entry list 

 (R) denotes rookie driver.

Practice

First practice 
The first practice session was held on Friday, September 11, at 11:00 AM EST. The session would last for one hour and 15 minutes.

Second practice 
The second practice session was held on Friday, September 11, at 2:30 PM EST. The session would last for two hours and 10 minutes.

Final practice 
The final practice session, sometimes known as Happy Hour, was held on Saturday, September 12, at 12:00 PM EST. The session would last for one hour.

Qualifying 
Qualifying was split into two rounds. The first round was held on Friday, September 11, at 5:30 PM EST. Each driver would have one lap to set a time. During the first round, the top 25 drivers in the round would be guaranteed a starting spot in the race. If a driver was not able to guarantee a spot in the first round, they had the option to scrub their time from the first round and try and run a faster lap time in a second round qualifying run, held on Saturday, September 12, at 2:00 PM EST. As with the first round, each driver would have one lap to set a time. On January 24, 1998, NASCAR would announce that the amount of provisionals given would be increased from last season. Positions 26-36 would be decided on time, while positions 37-43 would be based on provisionals. Six spots are awarded by the use of provisionals based on owner's points. The seventh is awarded to a past champion who has not otherwise qualified for the race. If no past champion needs the provisional, the next team in the owner points will be awarded a provisional.

Four drivers would fail to qualify: Buckshot Jones, Gary Bradberry, Ken Bouchard, and Rich Bickle.

Full qualifying results 

*Time not available.

Race results

References 

1998 NASCAR Winston Cup Series
NASCAR races at Richmond Raceway
September 1998 sports events in the United States
1998 in sports in Virginia